The Darwin Mountains is a group of mountains between the Darwin and Hatherton glaciers in Antarctica. Discovered by the British National Antarctic Expedition (1901–04) and named for Major Leonard Darwin, at that time Honorary Secretary of the Royal Geographical Society.

Features

 Access Slope
 Colosseum Ridge
 Communication Heights
 Conant Valley
 Corell Cirque
 Darwin Glacier
 Darwin Névé
 Duncan Bluff
 Exodus Glacier
 Exodus Valley
 Friedmann Peak
 Grant Valley
 Green Glacier
 Hale Valley
 Harvey Cirque
 Haskell Ridge
 Hatherton Glacier
 Island Arena
 Junction Spur
 Kennett Ridge
 Lindstrom Ridge
 Mason Nunatak
 McKay Valley
 Meteorite Hills
 Midnight Plateau
 Misthound Cirque
 Mount Ash
 Mount Ellis
 Muchmore Valley
 Overturn Glacier
 Polarmail Ledge
 Prebble Icefalls
 Richardson Hill
 Scheuermann Spur
 Score Ridge
 Skilton Ledge
 Smith Heights
 Tether Rock
 Wellman Valley

Further reading 
 Gunter Faure, Teresa M. Mensing, The Transantarctic Mountains: Rocks, Ice, Meteorites and Water, PP 297 – 300
 Christopher R. Fielding, Tracy D. Frank, John L. Isbell, Editors, Resolving the Late Paleozoic Ice Age in Time and Space, PP 59 – 69
 WARWICK F. VINCENT, CLIVE HOWARD-WILLIAMS, Nitrate-rich inland waters of the Ross Ice Shelf region, Antarctica, Antarctic Science 6 (3): 339-346 (1994), P 340

References

Mountain ranges of Oates Land
East Antarctica